The Way We Do It is the second studio album of Colonial Cousins, an Indian duo composed of singer Hariharan and singer-composer Lesle Lewis. It was released on November 19, 1998 under the label Sony BMG.

Reception
The first Colonial Cousins album was a tour de force. On November 19, 1998, their second album, a sophomore effort, The Way We Do It, was a continuation of and a departure from that first effort. Lyrically low-key, musically rich and groove-ridden, this album saw Hari and Lezz establish themselves as India's premier fusion artists.

The album was a continuation in musical terms to the extent that Lezz and Hari had done what they do best individually, and fused it into a format that enriches and complements each other. That said, the album was also a departure sound-wise from their eponymous first album. While that has a softer sound to it, their second album was edgier and groovier.

The album has some successful singles like the title track "The Way We Do It" with U. Srinivas playing on it, Dekhoon main Jahan penned by Javed Akhtar , "No Longer Mine" and "Lady".

The song "Lady" is highly regarded as a masterpiece by the band.  It is sung mostly in English and string parts based on Raga Hamsadhvani.

Track listing
From iTunes.

References

External links
 Listen The Way We Do it online
 Lyrics for the songs
 Review of the album

1998 albums
Colonial Cousins albums